The Exeed TX (codeproject M31T) is a mid-size CUV produced by Exeed a subsidiary of the Chery brand.

History 
The vehicle debuted at International Motor Show Germany in September 2017 in Frankfurt in pre-production form. The vehicle is based on the M3X platform developed by Chery with Magna International.

At the 2019 Shanghai International Auto Show, Chery showed off the production version of the TX under the new Exeed brand. Unlike the vehicle shown in Frankfurt, this version features no Chery branding whatsoever, instead featuring a larger grill and the Exeed name written out. Alongside the standard TX, Exeed also showed off the TXL which is a 7-passenger 3-row version of the standard TX. Other than the length and wheelbase, nothing else has fundamentally changed between it and the standard TX. Production start on 24 January 2019.

The price range of the Exeed TX starts from 130,000 and ends at 180,000 Yuan (~USD19,200 to 26,700). Exeed TX and TXL is both powered by a 1.6-litre turbocharged engine meeting the China VI (CN-6) emission standards. Additionally, the top of the trim TX Platinum version is equipped with a all-wheel drive system.

2021 facelift 

The Exeed TXL received a facelift for the 2021 model year. In comparison with the model it replaces, the restyled TXL gained a redesigned bumper with a grid formed by horizontal bars in body color. Additionally, restyled LED daytime running lights are positioned vertically and the redesigned air intake is positioned the bottom. The rear end received refurbished deflectors, reworked fenders and minor changes to the inside of the tail lamps. The interior changes include redesigned IP with digital screens both in the instrument panel and in the multimedia center console integrated forming a single unit.

Mechanically, the Exeed TXL facelift still uses the same powertrain as the pre-facelift model. The gearbox is an automated seven-speed dual-clutch transmission.

As of early August 2021 the Exeed TXL was announced with an additional Chinese name called the Lingyun (凌云).

Cancelled American version 
Under the name Vantas TX/TXL, the Exeed TX was planned to be the first Chery vehicle sold in North America starting in 2021 for the 2022 model year. Production was to take place in knock-down kit form in the United States at a not-yet-determined location. About 50% of the content would be made in China; the rest would come from North American suppliers. Chery planned a full assembly plant in the US for Vantas vehicles when sales increases. In April 2021, it was announced that the first model would begin production in 2022.

HAAH Automobile Holdings would act as Chery’s US distributor for the Vantas brand, specific to North America. However, the Chery brand cannot be used in the United States or Canada as General Motors citing that the Chery brand is too close to Chevrolet and its longtime Chevy nickname.

In July 2021, HAAH filed for bankruptcy and plans to sell the Vantas brand in North America were scrapped.

References

External links 
 

Exeed TX
Cars introduced in 2018
Crossover sport utility vehicles
Hybrid electric cars
All-wheel-drive vehicles
2010s cars
Cars introduced in 2019